Story of the Eye is a 1928 novella written by Georges Bataille that details the increasingly bizarre sexual perversions of a pair of teenage lovers, including an early depiction of omorashi fetishism in Western literature. It is narrated by the young man looking back on his exploits.

Plot
An unnamed boy in late adolescence initiates a strange sexual relationship with his distant cousin Simone when she indulges the narrator's dare to place her bare buttocks in a cat's saucer of milk. Simone and the narrator consummate their erotic desire at a cliff in front of his villa, involving their friend Marcelle in their activities; the pair soon reveal themselves to be exhibitionists, going so far as to have intercourse in full view of Simone's widowed mother. At one point, Simone develops a fetish for inserting soft-boiled eggs in her vagina and anus. The couple engage in a sadomasochistic orgy with other teenagers, which ends with Marcelle having a mental breakdown. The narrator runs away from home and moves in with Simone after stealing his father's money and gun. Marcelle, meanwhile, is admitted to a psychiatric hospital.

Simone and the narrator break Marcelle out of the hospital, but when she recognizes a wardrobe she hid in during the orgy, she hangs herself in a psychotic break. The couple wind up having penetrative sex in front of her body. To escape the legal consequences of Marcelle's suicide, the pair flee and take refuge in Spain. They meet the depraved English aristocrat Sir Edmund, who is happy to accommodate their lifestyle. Edmund tells Simone about the tradition in the aristocracy to eat the testicles of a recently killed bull while watching bull-fighting, and Simone demands the raw testicles of a bull be given to her when they are watching the famous matador El Granero. As Granero is impaled by a bull and his right eye is ripped out of its socket, Simone sticks one of the raw testicles up her vagina and has an orgasm at the same moment El Granero dies.

The three visit a Catholic basilica, where Simone seduces a handsome priest by masturbating while confessing inside of the confessional. Sir Edmund excitedly undertakes a blasphemous parody of the Catholic Eucharist involving desecration of the bread and wine using the priest's urine and semen; Simone strangles the priest to death during his final orgasm. Simone removes the priest's right eye and inserts it into her vagina while continuing her sexual relationship with the narrator. The trio evade the priest's murder investigation and head for Andalusia, where they buy a yacht to continue their debauchery on African soil.

In a postscript, Bataille reveals that the character of Marcelle may have been partially inspired by his own mother, who suffered from bipolar disorder, while the narrator's father is also modeled after his own unhappy paternal relationship. In an English-language edition, Roland Barthes and Susan Sontag provide critical comment on the events.

Barthes: Metaphors of the eye and liquid
Roland Barthes published the original French version of his essay "Metaphor of the Eye" in Bataille's own journal Critique, shortly after Bataille's death in 1962. Barthes' analysis focuses on the centrality of the eye to this series of vignettes, and notices that it is interchangeable with eggs, bulls' testicles and other ovular objects within the narrative. He also traces a second series of liquid metaphors within the text, which flow through tears, cat's milk, egg yolks, frequent urination scenes, blood and semen.

Furthermore, he argues that he does not believe that Story of the Eye is necessarily a pornographic narrative, given that these structuring chains of metaphors do provide coherent underpinning sequences.

Cultural references
Danish punk rock band Iceage references this book in the song "Ecstasy", and vocalist Elias Bender Rønnenfelt cited Story of the Eye as an influence in writing the album You're Nothing.
In the movie Weekend Corrine, the female lead, recounts an orgy she participated in, many of the details of which are derived from the first two chapters of Story of the Eye.
American indie pop band of Montreal references this book in the song "The Past is a Grotesque Animal" from the album Hissing Fauna, Are You the Destroyer?.

Adaptations
The 1974 Italian/Belgian co-produced Eurocult film Simona, which stars Laura Antonelli and Patrick Magee, is an avant-garde adaptation of Story of the Eye that was written and directed by one-time Belgian filmmaker Patrick Longchamps.
Georges Bataille's Story of the Eye – 2004 experimental film adaptation of the novel

References

Bibliography

1928 French novels
French erotic novels
French novellas
French novels adapted into films
Novels set in France
Novels set in Madrid
Works by Georges Bataille
Novels set in Seville
Novels about rape
Novels about murder
Novels about suicide
Masturbation in fiction